Green Tree Mall is an shopping mall located in Clarksville, Indiana, United States. The mall is located off of I-65 about four miles (6 km) north of downtown Louisville. It was named for a large boundary tree of considerable age that once stood at the location. Currently, there are more than 80 inline stores and 2 major anchor stores (Dillard's and JCPenney). The third anchor was Sears which closed on October 1, 2017. The mall is managed by Centennial Realty. Green Tree Mall is a retail anchor for the Clarksville area.

History
The first store to open at the mall was a Sears department store, which opened on September 29, 1966. The rest of the mall opened for business in 1968, including JCPenney and a Danners dime store  Prentice sold the mall in 1977 to a New York firm, The Macerich Real Estate Company. JCPenney and Sears remain at their original locations and Dillard's anchors the back annex.

The first Texas Roadhouse opened in 1993 and continues to operate today. Ben Snyder's department store was an original anchor. When Hess's purchased the Ben Snyder's chain, the company built a new store instead, and the former Ben Snyder's location became a food court. Hess's store is now Dillard's. The food court proved unsuccessful and was later known as Tumble Station before becoming a martial arts school in 2016.

The mall was owned by Santa Monica, California company Macerich until June 2013. Macerich acquired the Green Tree East area in 1989, which now has Burlington Coat Factory, T.J. Maxx, Fazoli's, Burger King and Arby's.

Macerich sold the mall in June 2013 to CBL Properties. It was sold again to Centennial Realty in 2021.

On July 7, 2017, it was announced that Sears would be closing as part of a plan to close 43 stores nationwide. The store closed in October 2017.

Community involvement
Green Tree Mall plays host to Club Mom, a children's entertainment event, on the first Tuesday of every month. In addition to its club event, the mall has Kids Day, which is similar to a large Club Mom.

In 2007, the mall was set to host the first Kentucky Derby Festival event in Indiana with the U.S. Bank Derby Festival Great Balloonfest, but it was canceled due to poor weather.

Gallery

See also
River Falls Mall

References

External links

Clarksville, Indiana
Shopping malls in Indiana
Shopping malls established in 1968
Buildings and structures in Clark County, Indiana
Tourist attractions in Clark County, Indiana